Tube Investments of India Limited is an Indian engineering and manufacturing company that specializes in bicycles, metal formed products, and chains. It is based in Chennai and a part of Murugappa Group. It was incorporated as TI Cycles of India Limited in 1949, as a joint venture company.

History
 1949: Established TI Cycles of India Limited (present day Tube Investments of India Limited) in association with Tube Investments Limited, UK (present day TI Group)
 1955: Established Tube Products of India Limited in association with Tube Products (Old Bury) Limited, UK
 1960:
Established TI Diamond Chains Limited in association with Diamond Chain Company (Usa)
Established TI Miller in association with Miller, UK
 1965: Established TI Metal Forming
 1990: Acquired Press Metal Corporation
 1993: TIDC acquired Satavahana Chains
 1999: TPI acquired Steel Strips And Tubes Limited
 2001:
TII acquired Cholamandalam Investment and Finance Company Limited
Established Cholamandalam MS General Insurance Company Ltd
 2010: TI India acquired French chain manufacturer Sedis
In 2012, Tube Investments bought a 44.12% controlling stake in Coimbatore-based Shanthi Gears for  292 crore.
In 2014, the large diameter tubing plant was inaugurated

Divisions
The major divisions are:
 TI Cycles of India (TICI)
 BSA Motors (BSAM)
 Tube Products of India (TPI)
 TI Diamond Chains (TIDC)
 TI Metal Forming (TIMF)
 Shanti Gears
 TI TMT Macho

TI Cycles of India

TI Cycles of India (a unit of Tube Investments of India Ltd.) is a bicycle manufacturer based in India. Established in 1949 by the Murugappa Group and Sir Ivan Stedeford of Tube Investments Group in UK, TI Cycles is the maker of brands like Hercules, BSA and Philips cycles. Currently it is the first largest cycle manufacturer in India and number one manufacturer in special segments like mountain bikes, sports lite roadsters, racing bikes etc. It has a manufacturing capacity of around three million bicycles per year. Of late, TI Cycles has begun to sponsor a variety of cycling events, one of them being the 900+ km Tour of Nilgiris, through its brand BSA.

TI Cycles of India brands:
 TI Cycles
 BSA
 Hercules
 Philips Cycles
 Track & Trail
 Montra
 Roadeo

Track and Trail India is an initiative of TI Cycles India with the objective to bring brands such as Bianchi, Schwinn, Cannondale, Ducati, etc. to the Indian market.

TI Cycles of India has manufacturing plants at:
 Ambattur, Chennai
 Nasik, Maharashtra
 Noida, Uttar Pradesh
 Rajpura, Punjab

Tube Products of India (TPI)
Tube Products of India (TPI) is a steel tubes manufacturer based in India. Tube Products of India was established in the year 1955 in collaboration with Tube Products (Old Bury) Limited, UK to produce Electric resistance welding (ERW) and Cold Drawn Welded (CDW) tubes also called as Drawn Over Mandrel tubes.

The manufacturing locations of Tube Products of India are located at:
Avadi, Chennai, Tamil Nadu
Shirwal, Maharashtra
Mohali, Punjab
Tiruttani, Tamil Nadu (Large Diameter Plant)

BSA Motors
BSA Motors is a manufacturer of non-pollutant electric vehicles. It has its manufacturing plant in Avadi, Tiruvallur district.

TI Diamond Chains
TI Diamond Chains, simply known as TIDC India, was established as a joint venture between Tube Investments of India Limited & Diamond Chain Company Inc USA. Tube Investments of India Limited merged it with as a division called TIDC India. TIDC India is a chain manufacturer in segments such as industrial, automotive and fine blanking.

TIDC India's manufacturing plants are:
 TIDC India, 11, M. T. H Road, Ambattur, Tiruvallur district.
 Gangnouli, Laksar, Haridwar, Uttrakhand.
 Kazipally Village, Jinnaram Mandal, Medak District, Telangana.

TI Metal Forming
TI Metal Forming was established in 1965 as a division of Tube Investments of India Limited. It manufactures car door frame (skin parts), glass separator channels, door guide rails (stainless steel), window channels, side impact beams, casing for starter motor (deep drawn part), HCV chassis and CRF sections for railway wagons and coaches.

TI Metal Forming's manufacturing plants:
 Thiruninravur, Tiruvallur district
 Bawal, Rewari district, Haryana
 Sanand, Ahmedabad district, Gujarat
 Halol, Panchmahal district, Gujarat
 Kakkalur, Tiruvallur district
 Laksar,  Haridwar District, Uttrakhand

Subsidiaries
 Sedis Chains France
CG Power and Industrial Solutions

See also
 Cholamandalam Investment and Finance Company
 Cholamandalam MS General Insurance

References

External links
 tiindia.com Tube Investments of India Limited Official Website
 tubeproductsindia.com Tube Products of India (TPI) Official Website
 tidcindia.in TI Diamond Chains (TIDC) Official Website
 bsahercules.com BSA Hercules Official Website
 trackandtrail.in Track and Trail Cycles Official Website
 bsamotorsindia.com BSA Motors Official Website
 BSA Workouts Official Website
 timetalforming.com TI Metal Forming Official Website

Cycle manufacturers of India
Companies based in Chennai
Murugappa Group
Indian companies established in 1949
Manufacturing companies established in 1949
Companies listed on the Bombay Stock Exchange
Companies listed on the National Stock Exchange of India